Oliyarik Waterfalls is a waterfall situated near Anchal in Kollam district, India. It is the less known one among the four waterfalls in Kollam district. The falls is about 55 km away from Kollam city.

See also
 Kumbhavurutty Waterfalls
 Palaruvi Falls
 Manalar Waterfalls

References

Waterfalls of Kollam district